The 4th constituency of Budapest is one of the single member constituencies of the National Assembly, the national legislature of Hungary. The constituency standard abbreviation: Budapest 04. OEVK.

Since 2022, it has been represented by Bence Tordai of the Dialogue for Hungary party.

Geography
The 2nd constituency is located in north-western part of Buda.

The constituency borders with 2nd constituency of Pest County to the northwest, 3rd constituency of Pest County to the north, 10th- and 7th constituency to the east and 3rd constituency to the south.

List of districts
The constituency includes the following municipalities:

 District II.: Main part of the district (except Víziváros, Országút and south of the Hűvösvölgyi út).
 District III.: Western part of the district.

History
The 4th constituency of Budapest was created in 2011 and contained of the pre-2011 abolished constituencies of the part of 2nd and 4th constituency of the capital. Its borders have not changed since its creation.

Members
The constituency was first represented by Mihály Varga of the Fidesz from 2014 to 2022. He was succeeded by Bence Tordai of the Dialogue for Hungary in 2022 (with United for Hungary support).

Election result

2022 election

2018 election

2014 election

Notes

References

Budapest 4th